Jordy Tshimanga (born November 4, 1996) is a Canadian professional basketball player for the Iowa Wolves of the NBA G League. He played college basketball for the Dayton Flyers and the Nebraska Cornhuskers.

Early life and high school career
Tshimanga was born in Montreal, the son of two Congolese parents. He has six brothers and sisters. Growing up, Tshimanga focused on football and began playing basketball in his teens. He attended MacDuffie School in Granby, Massachusetts and blossomed as a basketball player.

Recruiting
Tshimanga was a four-star selection by Scout.com and was rated as the No. 150 prospect in the senior class by Rivals.com. He was rated the No. 19 center in the country by Scout, No. 22 by 247Sports and No. 25 by ESPN.com.  Tshimanga was ranked as the No. 15 prospect in New England by the New England Recruiting Report while ESPN.com rated him as the third-best prospect in the state of Massachusetts in 2016. He received offers from Arizona, Arizona State, Baylor, Boston College, Central Florida, LSU, Minnesota, Nebraska, Oklahoma State, Pittsburgh, Providence, SMU, UNLV, and Virginia Tech.
Following official visits to Minnesota, Nebraska and UNLV, Tshimanga committed to Cornhuskers on May 15, 2016.

College career

Freshman year
Tshimanga appeared in all 31 games, averaging 5.0 points and 4.0 rebounds per game as a true freshman. He made significant strides throughout the season and played his best basketball during conference play, averaging 5.7 points and 4.2 rebounds per game, despite playing more than 20 minutes once in Big Ten play. Tshimanga led the Huskers in field goals percentage (.481) in conference play and was fourth on the team in rebounding. He scored a career-high 15 points and grabbed 9 rebounds in just 24 minutes in Nebraska's 72–61 loss against Michigan State on February 2, 2017.

Sophomore year
Tshimanga averaged 4.0 points and 4.6 rebounds per game his sophomore season. During the 2017–18 season, Tshimanga temporarily left the team due to undisclosed "personal issues", missing two games in January 2018 before returning. Following the season, in July 2018, Tshimanga announced his intention to transfer from Nebraska.

Junior year
Tshimanga ended up transferring to Dayton and sat out the 2018–19 season as a redshirt. He missed the preseason with a knee injury and did not practice with the team until shortly before the Maui Invitational. As a junior, Tshimanga averaged 3.0 points and 2.4 rebounds per game as a reserve.

Senior year
On February 9, 2021, Tshimanga posted 14 points and 12 rebounds in a 76-67 loss to VCU. As a senior, he became a starter and averaged 6.7 points and 7.7 rebounds per game. Tshimanga was named to the  Atlantic 10 Academic Team.

Professional career

Cleveland Charge / Iowa Wolves (2021–2022)
After going undrafted in the 2021 NBA draft, Tshimanga signed with the Cleveland Charge of the NBA G League on October 23, 2021. He played four games and averaged 3.5 points, 2.0 rebounds, and 12.5 minutes.

On November 15, 2021, Tshimanga was traded from the Charge to the Iowa Wolves, where he played 38 games and averaged 6.7 points and 6.5 rebounds in 17.3 minutes. During the season, he grabbed a career-high 17 rebounds on January 16 and a career-high 4 blocks on March 23, which the Wolves secure a top 5 rebounding total league-wide, with a team-high 186 total rebounds.

Saskatchewan Rattlers (2022)
On April 22, 2022, Tshimanga signed with the Saskatchewan Rattlers of the CEBL.

Return to Iowa (2023–present)
On January 13, 2023, Tshimanga was reacquired by the Iowa Wolves.

Career statistics

College

|-
| style="text-align:left;"| 2016–17
| style="text-align:left;"| Nebraska
| 31 || 9 || 12.5 || .449 || – || .625 || 4.0 || .3 || .5 || .5 || 5.0
|-
| style="text-align:left;"| 2017–18
| style="text-align:left;"| Nebraska
| 31 || 18 || 13.6 || .455 || – || .564 || 4.6 || .5 || .3 || .5 || 4.0
|-
| style="text-align:left;"| 2018–19
| style="text-align:left;"| Dayton
| style="text-align:center;" colspan="11"|  Redshirt
|-
| style="text-align:left;"| 2019–20
| style="text-align:left;"| Dayton
| 27 || 0 || 9.8 || .667 || – || .538 || 2.4 || .4 || .2 || .5 || 3.0
|- class="sortbottom"
| style="text-align:center;" colspan="2"| Career
| 89 || 27 || 12.1 || .490 || – || .589 || 3.7 || .4 || .3 || .5 || 4.0

Personal life
Jordy is the son of Florent Tshimanga and was born on November 4, 1996. He has two older brothers, Link Kabadyundi and Yannick Wak, and two sisters, Yasmine Bidikuindila and Florence Tshimanga. Tshimanga's family originates from the Democratic Republic of the Congo and he speaks three languages (English, French and Lingala). Tshimanga majored in psychology at Nebraska.

References

External links
Dayton Flyers bio
Nebraska Cornhuskers bio

1996 births
Living people
Basketball players from Montreal
Canadian expatriate basketball people in the United States
Canadian men's basketball players
Centers (basketball)
Cleveland Charge players
Dayton Flyers men's basketball players
Iowa Wolves players
Nebraska Cornhuskers men's basketball players
Saskatchewan Rattlers players